Lady Mary Wentworth-Fitzwilliam (1851–1921) was the daughter of  William Wentworth-FitzWilliam, 6th Earl FitzWilliam and of Lady Frances Harriet Douglas. On 23 May 1872 she married Hugh Le Despencer Boscawen (1849–1908), son of Evelyn Boscawen, 6th Viscount Falmouth (1819–1889).

Lady Mary was one of eight train bearers at the wedding of Princess Helena's wedding to Prince Christian of Schleswig-Holstein on 5 July 1866 at Windsor Castle, Windsor, Berkshire, England.

Rosarian Henry Bennett (1823–1890) named the rose cultivar Lady Mary Fitzwilliam in her honour.

References 

1851 births
1921 deaths
Daughters of British earls
Daughters of Irish earls